Jacob Hendricus Maris (August 25, 1837 – August 7, 1899) was a Dutch painter, who with his brothers Willem and Matthijs belonged to what has come to be known as the Hague School of painters. He was considered to be the most important and influential Dutch landscape painter of the last quarter of the nineteenth century. His first teacher was painter J.A.B. Stroebel who taught him the art of painting from 1849 to 1852. Jacob Maris's most known works are the series of portraits of the royal House of Orange, he worked on these with his brother Matthijs Maris. He is also known for landscapes such as Ship on the Scheveningen beach.

Life

He was born in The Hague. When he was twelve he took some art lessons and later enrolled in the Hague Academy of Art. from 1850 to 1853 he attended this highly ranked art University.  An art dealer recognized his talent and saw to it that Jacob was able to work in the studio of Hubertus van Hove.  There he painted interiors as well as figurative and genre works. Van Hove took Maris under his wings and was not only his boss but also his new teacher.

Van Hove moved to Antwerp and the nineteen-year-old Maris went with him. This relationship continued until his brother Matthijs received a royal subsidy and joined Jacob.  Together they rented space which also had room for their friend Lawrence Alma-Tadema. They took lessons at the Antwerp Academy and were able to sell some of their works. After this he traveled through Germany, Switzerland and France in 1861.

Like many of the Hague School alumni, Jacob Maris had enormous success in the Netherlands and abroad. He sold the biggest part of his paintings to private collectors in the United States and in Scotland.

In 1857, Jacob Maris returned to the Hague, but Matthijs stayed another year in Antwerp before he again shared a studio with Jacob in The Hague. After they had earned enough money by copying eight royal portraits, they were able to go to Oosterbeek where they met Johannes Warnardus Bilders, his son Gerard, and others who later play important parts in the Hague School. 
The brothers also went on a study trip together  to Germany, Switzerland and France.  
When their money was spent, they again moved in with their parents and Jacob took more lessons at the Hague Academy of Art. 
In the summer of 1864, Jacob again went to Oosterbeek and possibly to Fontainebleau and Barbizon.  
Following this trip he lived in  Paris from 1865 till 1871, and then returned to the Netherlands when the Franco-Prussian War broke out.

In The Hague, he became a strong landscape painter painting rivers and landscapes with mills and towpaths, and beach views with fishing boats.   His stroke became broader and larger and his use of color became more subdued and directed towards portraying the atmospheric depiction of clouds. This part of has been compared to the seventeenth-century painters Jan van Goyen, Jacob Van Ruisdael and Johannes Vermeer. His way of working has been described in the following way:  Also, M. Philippe Zilcken said, 

In 1871, Maris became a member of the Pulchri Studio and would fill various administrative positions there. It was only after 1876 that he experienced any renown  in the Netherlands and from 1885 on he was a celebrated painter. As a leader of the Hague School his influence was enormous. Nevertheless, Willem de Zwart and possibly Bernard Blommers had been his only students.

When he was in his sixties, Maris began to suffer from asthma and corpulence.  
At the advice of his doctors he went to take the waters at Karlsbad, where he suddenly died on 7 August 1899.  He was buried in The Hague.

Sources
Sillevis, John and Tabak, Anne, The Hague School Book, Waanders Uitgegevers, Zwolle, 2004  (pp 267–276)
Sheila D. Muller, Dutch Art An Encyclopedia, Garland publishing Inc, New York and London, 1997 (pp 235–236)

References

Attribution

External links

Overview of his work at the Nunspeet Museum website
 images of paintings and drawings by Jacob Maris, in the RijksStudio of the Rijksmuseum, Amsterdam 
 biography information on Jacob Maris and other sources; in the Dutch R.K.D. Archive, The Hague
 The Brothers Maris (James – Matthew – William), ed. Charles Holme; text by D.C. Thomson; publishers: Offices of 'The Studio', London - Paris, 1907

1837 births
1899 deaths
Hague School
19th-century Dutch painters
Dutch male painters
Dutch landscape painters
Artists from The Hague
Royal Academy of Fine Arts (Antwerp) alumni
Commanders of the Order of the Netherlands Lion
19th-century Dutch male artists